Swan River is the name of some communities in the U.S. state of Minnesota:

 Swan River, Itasca County, Minnesota, an unincorporated community in northern Minnesota
 Swan River Township, Morrison County, Minnesota, a township in central Minnesota